BPF may refer to:

Organisations
 Badminton Players Federation, an independent organisation of badminton
 Banco Português de Fomento, a Portuguese state-owned development bank
 Belarusian Popular Front,  a political party
 Bodoland People's Front, Kokrajhar
 British Plastics Federation, a UK trade association
 British Polio Fellowship, a medical research charity
 British Property Federation, a membership organisation
 Buddhist Peace Fellowship, a nonsectarian international network
 Business and Professionals Federation of Hong Kong, a think tank

Science and technology
 Band-pass filter, a device that passes frequencies within a certain range
 eBPF, a technology to run sandboxed programs in the operating system
 Berkeley Packet Filter, a mechanism to write/read packets to/from network interface

Medicine
 Brazilian purpuric fever, an illness in children
 Bronchopleural fistula, a disease of the lungs
 Bradykinin-potentiating factor, of the inflammatory mediator bradykinin

Other uses
 British Pacific Fleet, a Royal Navy fleet of World War II
 Batting park factor, a baseball statistic
 Batuna Airport (IATA code), Solomon Islands; see List of airports by IATA code
 Brighton Photo Fringe, running in parallel with the Brighton Photo Biennial
 Bailey Peacock-Farrell, a Northern Irish football goalkeeper